Osborne , along with Osbourne, Osbern and Osborn, is an English name cognate with, and possibly influenced by the Old Norse Ásbjørn. The English Os (see Ós) and the Norse Ás (see Aesir) mean God, while bjørn means bear in Norse.

People with the surname Osborne
Aaron Osborne (1947–1995), American modern dancer and teacher
Adam Osborne (1939–2003), computer pioneer
Alexandra Osborne (born 1995), Australian tennis player
Anders Osborne (born 1966), American singer-songwriter
Barrie M. Osborne, (born 1944), American film producer
Bertín Osborne (born 1953), Spanish singer
Bertrand Osborne (born 1935), Chief Minister of Montserrat
Betty Osborne (1952–1971), Canadian murder victim
Bill Osborne (born 1955), New Zealand rugby union player
Bobby Osborne (born 1931), American musician, half of the Osborne Brothers, along with his brother Sonny
Buzz Osborne (born 1964), American musician
Lady Camilla Osborne (born 1950), English heiress
Charles Osborne (disambiguation), several people
Charles Osborne (politician), MP (1759–1817), Irish politician and judge
Sir Charles Osborne, 14th Baronet (1825–1879), Irish baronet of the Osborne baronets
Charles Osborne (American football) (c. 1885 – after 1907), American football player and coach
Charles Nelson Osborne better known as Uncle Charlie Osborne (1890–1992), American folk musician
Charles Osborne (hiccups) (1894–1991), American citizen who suffered from hiccups for 68 years
Charles Osborne (music writer) (1927–2017), Australian-born writer on classical music and of Agatha Christie adaptations
Uncle Charlie Osborne (1890–1992), American musician
Chuck Osborne (1939–1979), American professional basketball player
Chuck Osborne (American football) (1973–2012), American football player
Colin Osborne (born 1975), English darts player
Curtis Osborne (1970–2008), American convicted murderer
Daphne Osborne (1930–2006), British plant scientist
Deirdre Osborne, Australian-born academic
Dennis H. Osborne, (1919-2016), British painter
Dorothy Osborne (1627–1695), English writer
Duffield Osborne (1858–1917), American author and ornithologist
Ernest Osborne (1873–1926), Australian cricketer
Ernest Osborne (footballer) (1899–1954), English footballer
Francis Osborne, 5th Duke of Leeds (1751–1799), British politician
F. Edward Osborne, American politician
Fred Osborne (1865–1907), Canadian baseball player
Gary Osborne, British singer and songwriter
George Osborne, 6th Duke of Leeds (1775–1831), British nobility
George Osborne (born 1971), British politician and former Chancellor of the Exchequer
Helen Betty Osborne (1952–1971), Canadian murder victim
Hewett Osborne (1567–1599), English soldier
James Osborne (VC) (1857–1928), English First Boer War hero
Jeffrey Osborne (born 1948), singer
Jim Osborne (American football), American football player
Jim Osborne (tennis), tennis player
Joan Osborne (born 1962), American musician
John Osborne (1929–1994), English playwright
John Osborne (Montserrat politician), (1936–2011), Montserrat politician
John Eugene Osborne (1858–1943), American politician
John Michael "Ozzy" Osbourne, English singer, songwriter, actor, and television personality (born 1948)
John Walter Osborne (1828–1902), Irish photo-lithography pioneer
Kate Osborne, British Labour MP
Mark Osborne (disambiguation), several people
 Mark Osborne (cricketer) (born 1961), Australian cricketer
 Mark Osborne (ice hockey) (born 1961), Canadian ice hockey player
 Mark Osborne (filmmaker) (born 1970), American film director
Mary Pope Osborne, American author
Matt Osborne (born 1957), American professional wrestler
Milton Osborne, Australian historian
Nigel Osborne (born 1948), British composer
Paul Osborne, Australian rugby league footballer and politician
Ralph Bernal Osborne (1808–1882), British politician
Richard Osborne (born 1964), Australian rules footballer
Robert Osborne (1932–2017), American actor and film historian
Robert M. Osborne (1852–1931), newspaper proprietor and editor in South Australia, Tasmanian mayor, brother of Samuel
Robin Osborne (born 1957), historian of antiquity
Samuel W. Osborne (1868–1952), newspaper proprietor and editor in South Australia, brother of Robert
Sandra Osborne (born 1956), Scottish politician
Sonny Osborne (born 1937), American bluegrass singer and banjo player, half of the Osborne Brothers duo, with his brother Bobby
Stephen Osborne (writer) (born 1947), Canadian writer
Steve Osborne, music producer
Steven Osborne (pianist), (born 1971), Scottish pianist
Ted Osborne (1900 or 1901–1968), comic artist
Thomas Osborne (disambiguation), several people
Thomas Osborne, 1st Duke of Leeds (1631–1712), English statesman
Thomas Mott Osborne (1859–1926), American prison reformer
Thomas W. Osborn (1833–1898), American soldier and politician
Tom Osborne (born 1937), American politician and football coach
R. Travis Osborne (born 1913), American psychologist
Walter Osborne (1859–1903), Irish impressionist landscape and portrait painter
Weedon Osborne (1892–1918), American military officer
Will Osborne (rugby) (1875–1???), Wales international rugby player
Will Osborne (singer) (1905–1981), Canadian singer
William Osborne (disambiguation), several people
 Qwominer William Osborne, British Virgin Islands politician
 William Osborne (umpire), National League umpire in 1876
 William H. Osborne (born 1960), former president and CEO of Federal Signal Corporation
 William Osborn (Medal of Honor) (1837–1887), American soldier and Medal of Honor recipient
 William A. Osborn (born 1947), American bank executive
 William Church Osborn (1862–1951), New York State Democratic Committee Chairman, 1914–1916
 William G. Osborne, respondent in District Attorney's Office v. Osborne, a U.S. Supreme Court case
 William H. Osborn (1821–1894), American railroad tycoon
 Sir William Osborne, 8th Baronet (died 1783), Irish baronet and politician
Willson Osborne (1906–1979), American composer
Winton B. Osborne (died 1998), American politician

People with the given name Osborne
Osborne Reynolds, innovator in the understanding of fluid dynamics
Osbern the Steward, steward to two Dukes of Normandy
Osbern FitzOsbern, Anglo-Norman Bishop of Exeter
Osborne Smith (born 1954), better known as Ozzie Smith, American baseball player
Osborne Bingham, birth name of American record producer Dinky Bingham

People with the middle name Osborne
Andrew Osborne Hayfield (1905-1981), American businessman and politician

Fictional characters
Darren Osborne, from the British soap opera Hollyoaks
Jeremy Osborne, from the British sitcom Peep Show
Super Dave Osborne, a character created by American comedian Bob Einstein
Reverend Osborne Whitworth, supporting character in the third and fourth seasons of Poldark

See also
Ausburn, a surname and given name
Osborn (disambiguation)
Osborn (surname)
Osborne (disambiguation)
Osbourne (disambiguation)
Usborne (disambiguation)

References

English-language surnames
Surnames of English origin
Scottish surnames
Patronymic surnames